Castlevania is a video game series, created and developed by Konami.

Castlevania may also refer to:

Video games
 Castlevania (1986 video game), the first game in the video game series
 Castlevania (1999 video game), the Nintendo 64 game
 Castlevania: Circle of the Moon, a Game Boy Advance game called Castlevania in Europe
 Castlevania: Lament of Innocence, the PlayStation 2 game called Castlevania in Europe and Japan

Film and television
 Castlevania, a cancelled film by Sylvain White based on the video game
 Castlevania (TV series), an animated series by Netflix

Music
 "Castlevania", a song by Valery Kipelov and Sergey Mavrin from the album Smutnoye Vremia
 Le Castle Vania, an electronic music project from Atlanta, Georgia.